First Parish of Sudbury refers to both an historic meetinghouse and a Unitarian Universalist congregation in Sudbury, Massachusetts. The meetinghouse was built in 1797 on the site of the first meetinghouse built on the west side on the Sudbury River. The meetinghouse was designed by Captain Thomson and built at a cost of $6,025.93. It was paid for by the Town of Sudbury to be the meetinghouse for both  Town Meetings and parish worship.

The original meetinghouse on the site, built in 1723, was the first building in the Sudbury Center Historic District. The current meetinghouse is prominent at the center of the district.

On April 19, 1775, the town's Minutemen mustered at First Parish, known at the time as the West Side meetinghouse. The company, led by Captain John Nixon, fought at the Battles of Lexington and Concord.

The meetinghouse continued to be used for both Town meetings and worship until the Town built it Town House in 1846,  10 years after the separation of Church and State in Sudbury. The separation was accomplished by the transfer of the Ministerial from the town to the Parish at Two Meeting in 1836.

History of the Congregation 

The First Parish congregation was first gathered in 1640 and the first deacon was  Edmund Rice. The first meetinghouse was built at the site of the Old North Cemetery in what is now Wayland, Massachusetts. Due to the hardship of crossing the inhabitants of the west side of Sudbury River petitioned the Massachusetts General Court to build a second meetinghouse in 1708. Although it was initially denied, a second meetinghouse was built on the west side of the river in 1722. The Town of Sudbury split into Sudbury and East Sudbury in 1780. The latter became Wayland. 

The congregation split again in 1837 due to the divisions between members influenced by Transcendentalism and the Unitarian movement and the more Orthodox members.

List of First Parish ministers until the 1837 split
1639-1678 Edward Brown (died 1678)
1678-1707 James Sherman (dismissed)
1705-1772 Israel Loring (died 1772)
1772-1816 Jacob Bigelow (died 1816)
1816-1839 Rufus Hurlbut (died 1839), from 1837 minister of the Orthodox Congregational Church

Recent Years

Rev. Kathleen Hepler started as minister in 2022. In line with other member congregations of the UUA, the congregation adheres to the Unitarian Universalist faith and affirms the  Seven Principles of Unitarian Universalism.

References

External links 
 First Parish of Sudbury, Unitarian Universalis

Unitarian Universalist churches in Massachusetts
Churches in Middlesex County, Massachusetts